Işık is a unisex Turkish name and a surname. Notable people with the name are follows:

Given name

First name
 Işık Koşaner (born 1945), Turkish general
 Işık Kaan Arslan (born  2001), Turkish football player
 Işık Menküer (born 1964), Turkish volleyball player and coach

Middle name
 Ocak Işık Yurtçu (1945–2012), Turkish reporter

Surname
 Ayhan Işık (1929-1979), Turkish film actor
 Fatma Işık (born 1991), Turkish-German football player
 Fikri Işık (born 1965), Turkish educator and politician
 Hasan Esat Işık (1916–1989), Turkish diplomat and politician 
 Hüseyin Hilmi Işık (1911-2001), Turkish Islamic scholar
 Mehmet Esat Işık (1865–1936), Turkish physician 
 Selen Pınar Işık, known as PuCCa (writer) (born 1987), Turkish writer
 Vahap Işık (born 1982), Turkish football player
 Volkan Işık (born 1967), Turkish rally driver

Fictional characters
 Arif Işık, main character in the 2018 Turkish film Arif V 216

Turkish-language surnames
Turkish unisex given names